Madhuca kingiana is a tree in the family Sapotaceae. It is named for the botanist George King.

Description
The bark is greyish brown. Inflorescences bear up to six flowers.

Distribution and habitat
Madhuca kingiana is native to Sumatra, Peninsular Malaysia and Borneo. Its habitat is lowland mixed dipterocarp forest to  altitude.

Conservation
Madhuca kingiana has been assessed as near threatened on the IUCN Red List. The species is threatened by logging and conversion of land for palm oil plantations.

References

kingiana
Trees of Sumatra
Trees of Peninsular Malaysia
Trees of Borneo
Plants described in 1906